Ro-18, originally named Submarine No. 35, was an Imperial Japanese Navy Kaichū-Type submarine of the Kaichū III subclass. She was commissioned in 1921 and operated in the waters of Japan. She was stricken in 1936.

Design and description
They displaced  surfaced and  submerged.

For surface running, the submarines were powered by two  Sulzer Mark II diesel engines, each driving one propeller shaft. When submerged each propeller was driven by a  electric motor. They could reach  on the surface and  underwater.

The submarines were armed with six  torpedo tubes, four internal tubes in the bow and two external tubes mounted on the upper deck, and carried a total of ten Type 44 torpedoes. They were also armed with a single  deck gun mounted aft of the conning tower.

Construction and commissioning

Ro-18 was laid down as Submarine No. 35 on 20 October 1920 by the Kure Naval Arsenal at Kure, Japan. Launched on 25 March 1921, she was completed and commissioned on 15 December 1921.

Service history

Upon commissioning, Submarine No. 35 was assigned to the Kure Naval District. She was reassigned to Submarine Division 16 in Submarine Squadron 1 in the 1st Fleet on 20 December 1921. Submarine Division 16 was reassigned to Submarine Squadron 2 in the 2nd Fleet on 1 December 1922, and then to the Kure Naval District — in which it remained for the rest of the submarine′s active career — on 1 December 1923. In the years that followed, Submarine No. 35 was renamed Ro-18 on 1 November 1924, and Submarine Division 16 served in the Kure Defense Division from 10 December 1928 to 15 November 1934.

Ro-18 was stricken from the Navy list on 1 April 1936. On 1 April 1940, she was renamed Haisen No. 4. She served as a hulk at Tokuyama, Japan, through the end of World War II in August 1945. She eventually was sold for scrap. Scrapping began in 1947 and was completed in 1948.

Notes

References
, History of Pacific War Vol.17 I-Gō Submarines, Gakken (Japan), January 1998, 
Rekishi Gunzō, History of Pacific War Extra, "Perfect guide, The submarines of the Imperial Japanese Forces", Gakken (Japan), March 2005, 
The Maru Special, Japanese Naval Vessels No.43 Japanese Submarines III, Ushio Shobō (Japan), September 1980, Book code 68343-44
The Maru Special, Japanese Naval Vessels No.132 Japanese Submarines I "Revised edition", Ushio Shobō (Japan), February 1988, Book code 68344-36
The Maru Special, Japanese Naval Vessels No.133 Japanese Submarines II "Revised edition", Ushio Shobō (Japan), March 1988, Book code 68344-37
The Maru Special, Japanese Naval Vessels No.135 Japanese Submarines IV, Ushio Shobō (Japan), May 1988, Book code 68344-39

Ro-16-class submarines
Kaichū type submarines
Ships built by Kure Naval Arsenal
1921 ships